Sep. 9 - Eastern Orthodox liturgical calendar - Sep. 11

All fixed commemorations below celebrated on September 23 by Orthodox Churches on the Old Calendar.

For September 10th, Orthodox Churches on the Old Calendar commemorate the Saints listed on August 28.

Feasts
 Afterfeast of the Nativity of the Theotokos.

Saints
 Holy Apostles Apelles, Lucius (of Laodicea in Syria, not the Evangelist), and Clement, of the Seventy (1st century)
 Martyr Barypsabas in Dalmatia (2nd century)
 Martyrs Menodora, Metrodora, and Nymphodora at Nicomedia (305-311)
 Martyr Ia and 9,000 with her in Persia (363)  (see also: August 4, August 11, and September 11)
 Saint Eudokia the Child.
 Saint Pulcheria the Empress (453)  (see also: February 17)
 Venerable Peter and Paul, Bishops of Nicaea (9th century)

Pre-Schism Western saints
 Martyrs Nemesian, Felix, Lucius, another Felix, Litteus, Polyanus, Victor, Jader, Dativus and Companions (257)
 Saint Agapius (Agapitus), Bishop of Novara (447)
 Saint Veranus of Vence, son of St Eucherius of Lyons, he became a monk at Lérins, then later Bishop of Vence in the south of France (c. 480)
 Saint Finnian of Movilla (Findbarr, Winnin), Abbot, in Ulster (579)
 Saint Salvius, Bishop of Albi in Gaul, Confessor (584)
 Saint Candida the Younger, a married woman in Naples who hallowed herself as a wife and as a mother (586)
 Saint Theodard of Maastricht (c. 670)
 Saint Autbert, Bishop of Avranches, founder of the Monastery of Mont-St-Michel on the Normandy coast (c. 709)
 Saint Frithestan, a disciple of St Grimbald, he was consecrated Bishop of Winchester in England by St Plegmund (933)
 Saint Peter Martinez (Peter of Mozonzo), a monk at the monastery of St Mary of Mozonzo, later Abbot of St Martin in Compostella, and finally (c 986) Archbishop (c. 1000)

Post-Schism Orthodox saints
 Venerable Esaias, founder of the Kykkos Monastery in Cyprus (12th century)
 Venerable Paul the Obedient, of the Kiev Caves (13th-14th century)
 Saint Iosaph, monk, of Kubensk in Vologda (1453)
 Saint Cassian, Abbot of Spaso-Kamenny and White Lake Monasteries (1469)
 Saint Theodoritus, Archbishop of Ryazan and Murom (1617)

New martyrs and confessors
 New Hieromartyr Meletius (Fedyunev), Hieromonk, of Kuzhba (Komi) (1937)
 New Hieromartyr Gabriel (Yatsik), Archimandrite, of Donskoy Monastery, Moscow (1937)
 New Hieromartyrs Ismael Kudryavtsev, Eugene Popov, John Popov, Constantine Kolpetsky, Peter Grigoriev, Basil Maximov, Gleb Apukhtin, Basil Malinin, John Sofronov, Peter Yurkov, Nicholas Pavlinov, Palladius Popov, Priests (1937)
 Martyr Symeon Turkin (1937)
 Virgin-Martyr Tatiana Grimblit (1937)
 New Hieromartyr Warus (Shmarin), Bishop of Lipetsk (1938)

Other commemorations
 Translation of the relics of St. Egvin, Bishop of Worcester.
 Translation of the relics of St. Ethelwold, Bishop of Winchester.
 Synaxis of the Icon of the Theotokos "Trikeriotissas" (1825)
 Synaxis of the Theotokos "Orchomeniotissa" ("Panagia Skripou") (1943)
 Synaxis of the Saints of Lipetsk.
 Repose of Elder Tikhon (Golenkov) of Kapsala, Mount Athos, the spiritual father of St. Paisios the Athonite (1968)

Icon gallery

Notes

References

Sources
 September 10/September 23. Orthodox Calendar (PRAVOSLAVIE.RU).
 September 23 / September 10. HOLY TRINITY RUSSIAN ORTHODOX CHURCH (A parish of the Patriarchate of Moscow).
 September 10. OCA - The Lives of the Saints.
 The Autonomous Orthodox Metropolia of Western Europe and the Americas (ROCOR). St. Hilarion Calendar of Saints for the year of our Lord 2004. St. Hilarion Press (Austin, TX). pp. 67–68.
 The Tenth Day of the Month of September. Orthodoxy in China.
 September 10. Latin Saints of the Orthodox Patriarchate of Rome.
 The Roman Martyrology. Transl. by the Archbishop of Baltimore. Last Edition, According to the Copy Printed at Rome in 1914. Revised Edition, with the Imprimatur of His Eminence Cardinal Gibbons. Baltimore: John Murphy Company, 1916. pp. 278–279.
 Rev. Richard Stanton. A Menology of England and Wales, or, Brief Memorials of the Ancient British and English Saints Arranged According to the Calendar, Together with the Martyrs of the 16th and 17th Centuries. London: Burns & Oates, 1892. pp. 443–445.

 Greek Sources
 Great Synaxaristes:  10 ΣΕΠΤΕΜΒΡΙΟΥ. ΜΕΓΑΣ ΣΥΝΑΞΑΡΙΣΤΗΣ.
  Συναξαριστής. 10 Σεπτεμβρίου. ECCLESIA.GR. (H ΕΚΚΛΗΣΙΑ ΤΗΣ ΕΛΛΑΔΟΣ).
  10/09/. Ορθόδοξος Συναξαριστής.

 Russian Sources
  23 сентября (10 сентября). Православная Энциклопедия под редакцией Патриарха Московского и всея Руси Кирилла (электронная версия). (Orthodox Encyclopedia - Pravenc.ru).
  10 сентября по старому стилю  /  23 сентября по новому стилю. Русская Православная Церковь - Православный церковный календарь на  год.

September in the Eastern Orthodox calendar